Stella Schmolle, (1908-5 March 1975) was a British painter, known for the paintings she produced while serving in the Auxiliary Territorial Service during World War II and for her post-war portrait paintings.

Early life

Schmolle was born in Barnes in west London. She attended the Central School of Arts and Crafts. Upon graduating, in 1939, she worked as an commercial artist and illustrator. Works by Schmolle were shown at the Royal Academy between 1938 and 1940.

World War II
In December 1941, Schmolle applied to join the Art Department of the Ministry of Information but was not accepted. However the War Artists' Advisory Committee, WAAC, of the same Ministry agreed to assist her in obtaining materials to continue working as an artist during the Second World War. In 1942, Schmolle was conscripted into the Auxiliary Territorial Service, ATS, and initially did camouflage work before becoming an draughtswomen to an ATS intelligence officer. She served with the ATS in both Britain and, following the D-Day landings in 1944, also France and Belgium. During this period she continued to paint. Her subjects included scenes showing French collaborators in Normandy, British troops clearing an SS headquarters in Brussels and both ATS and civilian activities in Britain. Eventually seventeen of these pictures were purchased by the War Artists Advisory Committee.

Later life
After the war Schmolle was commissioned to produce a Stations of the Cross series for the Roman Catholic Chapel at the Royal Military Academy Sandhurst. She became an art teacher and was a well known portrait painter. For a time she taught at the Central School of Arts and Crafts, where she had been a student. Works by Schmolle are held by the British Museum, Auckland Art Gallery, the National Army Museum and the Imperial War Museum, which acquired the works previously purchased by WAAC.

References

External links 

 

1908 births
1975 deaths
20th-century English painters
20th-century English women artists
Alumni of the Central School of Art and Design
Auxiliary Territorial Service soldiers
British war artists
English portrait painters
English women painters
Painters from London
People from Barnes, London
World War II artists